Stamped is an iPhone app launched by a team of (mostly) former Google employees in November 2011 that keeps track and shares users' recommendations for restaurants, music, books, etc. on social media. Later, it was acquired by Yahoo in an effort to bolster the company's mobile platform.

References

Mobile software
American companies established in 2011
2012 mergers and acquisitions